Tuija Lydia Elisabeth Lindström (5 May 1950 – 26 December 2017) was a Finnish-Swedish photographer, artist and professor of photography at School of Photography and Film, University of Gothenburg in Gothenburg, Sweden, 1992–2001. She lived and worked in Stockholm, Sweden.

In the early 1990s, she became very noted for her black and white pictures of women floating in a black lake, known as Girls at Bull's Pond. Her pictures at this time addressed feminist issues but from a different perspective than has previously been customary in Sweden.

She has held several international exhibitions and is represented in particular at the Moderna Museet in Stockholm, the Houston Art Museum in the U.S., and Finnish Museum of Photography in Helsinki. Her 2012 exhibition A Dream If Ever There Was One at the Hasselblad Center in Gothenburg presented an overview of her work including landscapes, portraits, nudes and still lifes in collaboration with Helsinki's Finnish Museum of Photography.

Lindström was Sweden's first female professor in photography at the University of Gothenburg, establishing a master's programme and laying the foundations for ongoing photographic research.

References

Further reading 
 

1950 births
2017 deaths
Finnish photographers
Finnish women photographers
Swedish photographers
Swedish women photographers
Swedish people of Finnish descent
People from Stockholm